The Grifter's Hymnal is an album by Oklahoman singer-songwriter Ray Wylie Hubbard, released on March 27, 2012 on Bordello Records.

Guest appearances
Ian McLagan, the keyboardist for the Faces, appears on the album's song "Hen House", and Ringo Starr appears on "Coochy Coochy", a cover of one of Starr's own songs. Hubbard's son, Lucas, plays electric guitar on three songs on The Grifter's Hymnal.

Critical reception
According to Metacritic, The Grifter's Hymnal received universal acclaim from critics. Thom Jurek described it in AllMusic as "a swaggering, sexy, shake-your-ass, greasy, deep roots record" and gave it four stars out of five. Adam Vitcavage wrote in Paste that despite being in his sixties, Hubbard still displays many country attributes on the album.

Track listing
 Coricidin Bottle
 South of the River
 Lazarus
 New Year's Eve at the Gates of Hell
 Moss and Flowers
 Red Badge of Courage
 Train Yard
 Coochy Coochy (Ringo Starr cover)
 Mother Blues
 Henhouse
 Count My Blessings
 Ask God

References

2012 albums
Country albums by American artists